The Wave Ceptor series (stylized as WAVE CEPTOR or WaveCeptor) is a line of radio-controlled watches by Casio. Wave Ceptor watches synchronise with radio time signals broadcast by various government time services around the world. These signals transmit the time measured by atomic clocks accurate to one second in millions of years. By synchronizing daily with the signals, the Wave Ceptor watches achieve high accuracy, using a quartz crystal to keep time in the interim. Some radio watches, including some Wave Ceptors, are solar-powered, supported by a rechargeable battery. The watch displays may be fully digital, analog, or analog-digital. Hybrid Wave Ceptor models support GPS satellite reception of both time and location, in addition to broadcast signals.

Radio-controlled watches require no setting of time, date, or daylight saving time adjustments, as they attempt automatic synchronization several times every night. Without synchronisation, Wave Ceptors, like other commercial quartz timepieces, are typically accurate to ± 15 seconds per month; daily synchronization ensures 500 ms accuracy.

Most Wave Ceptor watches have a signal strength indicator which shows if the time signal is strong enough to correct the time set. The number of transmitters to which the watches can tune, vary according to watch model; most watches can tune to any one of several time signal broadcasts around the world. In Europe, the claimed reception range is approximately 1,500 kilometres.

Locations 
Casio watches synchronise to radio time signals from one or more of six low frequency time signal transmitters. The 60kHz signals from different transmitters are not compatible with each other; a watch designed for WWVB only cannot receive MSF.

Japan 

Watches can receive signals from two JJY transmitters: 

The 40kHz signal from Mount Otakadoya, near Fukushima (Ohtakadoyayama).

The 60kHz signal from the Haganeyama Transmitter at Mount Hagane (Haganeyama). 

China 

Watches receive the 68kHz signal from BPC at Shangqiu.

United States 

Watches receive the 60kHz signal from WWVB at Fort Collins. 

United Kingdom

Watches receive the 60kHz MSF at Anthorn.

Germany 

Watches receive the 77.5kHz DCF77 at Mainflingen.

As an example, Casio Wave Ceptors using modules 3353 and 3354, such as the WVA-440, can tune to signals from both DCF77 (Germany) and MSF (UK). The two submodels use the same electronics module, but with a soldered jumper selecting preferential tuning first to DCF77, or to MSF. This is default behaviour after a factory reset; the user can choose to use either one of the two transmitters with either module, although this limits use when travelling within Europe.

Multi-Band 6 

Casio Multi-Band 6 watches can tune to any of the six signals of the low frequency radio time signals. Some of the Casio G-Shock line of watches have Multi-Band 6 technology. The earlier Multi-Band 5 system could not receive the signal of the Chinese time signal transmitter.

Other radio watches
Japanese manufacturers Seiko and Citizen Watch, and German manufacturer Junghans, also make radio-controlled watches.

See also
 Atomic clock
 Radio clock

References

External links

Description of radio watch technology Casio website
Manuals for Casio watches

Casio watches